Caspiodontornis is a genus of the prehistoric pseudotooth birds of somewhat doubtful validity. These were probably rather close relatives of either pelicans and storks, or of waterfowl, and are here placed in the order Odontopterygiformes to account for this uncertainty.

Only a single species, Caspiodontornis kobystanicus, is known to date. Its remains – a fairly complete skull and beak – were found in early Late Oligocene (Chattian, MP25-30) rocks at Pirəkəşkül (Azerbaijan). From the same deposits the supposed giant swan Guguschia nailiae was described earlier; it is only known from wing bones. The affiliation of G. nailiae is not known but it does not seem to be a swan; the size of its remains agrees sufficiently well with those of C. kobystanicus to indicate that they may be from a single species, to which the older name G. nailiae would apply.

Footnotes

References

  (2005): Osteological evidence for sister group relationship between pseudo-toothed birds (Aves: Odontopterygiformes) and waterfowls (Anseriformes). Naturwissenschaften 92(12): 586–591.  (HTML abstract) Electronic supplement (requires subscription)
  (2009): Paleogene Fossil Birds. Springer-Verlag, Heidelberg & New York. 
  (2009): Evolution of the Cenozoic marine avifaunas of Europe. Annalen des Naturhistorischen Museums Wien A 111: 357–374 PDF fulltext
  (1985): The Fossil Record of Birds. In: : Avian Biology 8: 79-252. PDF fulltext

Fossil taxa described in 1982
Oligocene birds of Asia
Pelagornithidae
Prehistoric bird genera